is the 18.5th Touhou Project game, released at the 100th Comiket and on Steam on August 14, 2022.

Gameplay 

The gameplay involves collecting ability cards as the player challenges each stage repeatedly.

Plot 
Set after the events of Unconnected Marketeers, in 100th Black Market Marisa Kirisame sets off alone to investigate an incident where the value of ability cards are increasing, due to the opening of a black market where the gods are unable to intervene.

Development 
100th Black Market was announced on ZUN's blog in late July 2022, and released on August 14. The game was made to commemorate the 100th Comiket, and the 25th anniversary of the Touhou series.

Reception

References

External links 

 Official website (in Japanese)

Touhou Project games
Bullet hell video games
Windows games
Video games developed in Japan
2022 video games